Paul Schneider may refer to:

 Paul Schneider (painter) (1884–1969), last court painter of Wilhelm II of the German Empire
 Paul Schneider (pastor) (1897–1939), German pastor martyred during the Holocaust
 Paul Schneider (writer) (1923–2008), American television writer
 Paul Schneider (artist) (1927–2021), German artist and sculptor
 Paul Schneider (author) (born 1962), American author of non-fiction books and magazine articles
 Paul Schneider (actor) (born 1976), American film actor
 Paul Schneider (soccer) (born 1976), American who played professionally in the USL A-League
 Paul Schneider (director), American film and television director
 Paul A. Schneider (born 1944), Deputy Secretary of the US Department of Homeland Security 2008–2009
 Paul Schneider-Esleben (1915–2005), German modernist architect